MacHTTP is a webserver designed to run on the classic Mac OS versions 7.x through 9.x. It was written by software developer Chuck Shotton and was originally shareware; it dates from 1993; it is now available in source code form from SourceForge.net under the Perl Artistic License. The current version is 2.6.1. It is still used on some older Macintosh hardware. It was later commercialized as WebSTAR, sold originally by StarNine and later bought by Quarterdeck Software.

The program runs on Mac OS X under the Classic Environment, but has not been ported to run natively on Mac OS X (though an attempt was apparently underway in 2003 to do so). It has functionally been replaced with the Apache web server.

MacHTTP supports the Common Gateway Interface standard for generating dynamic content, as well as Apple Events for scriptability.

References

External links
The MacHTTP home page
The Sourceforge record for MacHTTP

Web server software
Macintosh-only software
Discontinued software